The men's 100 metres T37 took place in Stadium Australia.

There were three heats and one final round. The T37 is for athletes who have cerebral palsy or other coordination impairments, these athletes would have walk or run with a limp.

Heats

Heat 1

Heat 2

Heat 3

Final round

References

Athletics at the 2000 Summer Paralympics